Hypochaeris sessiliflora, the chikku chikku, is a South American species of plants in the family Asteraceae. It is a terrestrial herb of high Andean forest to high altitude páramo (2,500–4,500 m).

Hypochaeris sessiliflora is a small plant rarely more than 13 cm tall. Flowers are usually yellow or white, rarely purple or orange. Each head contains about 25 ray flowers but no disc flowers.

Distribution
 Colombia (South America)
 Ecuador (South America)
 Peru (South America)
 Venezuela (South America)
 Bolivia (South America)

References

External links
photo by Alwyn Howard Gentry, taken in Colombia

sessiliflora
Flora of South America
Plants described in 1818
Páramo flora